Choma is a town that serves as the capital of the Southern Province of Zambia. It is also the capital of Choma District, one of the 15 administrative districts in the province.

Location
The geographical coordinates of Choma are:16°46'16.0"S, 26°59'32.0"E
(Latitude:-16.771111; Longitude:26.992222).

Population
In 1990, the population of Choma was 30,143. In 2000, there were 40,405 people. The 2010 population census and household survey enumerated the population of the town at 51,842 inhabitants. The table below illustrates the same data.

Overview
Choma Town is home to a museum dedicated to the cultural heritage of the Tonga people of southern Zambia.

Education 
Choma has a range of both state-funded and private schools. Some of the state funded schools include: 1. Choma Day Secondary School, a mission school 2. Choma Secondary School, another mission school 3. Chuundu Day Secondary School 4. Batoka Secondary School 5. Masuku Secondary School, a mission school
6. Macha Girls' Secondary School, another mission school 7. Njase Girls' Secondary School, a mission school 8. St. Mark's Boys' Secondary School, a mission school 9. Swan Comprehensive School
10. St. Frances Davidson Day Secondary School, a mission school
and 11.St Mulumba's Special School, named after the Ugandan Saint Matiya Mulumba.

In 2016, the Government of Zambia indicated intentions to construct a public university in Choma, once suitable land is located.

Other considerations

Nightlife 
Choma is home to a number of bars and nightclubs including Club Leelove; DC Nitght Club and Choma Hotel & Bar These establishments have hosted notable Zambian artists including Macky 2, Petersen Zagaze and Mampi.

Food 
Choma has a variety of restaurants, cafes and street food stalls in Choma, including Wonderbake, Debonair's Pizza, Rachael's Lodge, and PMB Snacklite, within the gardens of Choma Museum. The main market, Makalanguzu, also sells ingredients and traditional street food, including fish, grains, tobacco leaves and roasted corn.

International presence 
From 2012 to 2017, Choma hosted successive teams of Voluntary Service Overseas (VSO) youth volunteers working in the areas of health, education and environment.

Notable residents 
 Gilbert Choombe, Zambian Olympic boxer 
 Emmanuel Zulu, Zambian soccer player
 Spencer Sautu, soccer player who plays for the Choma-based Green Eagles F.C.

See also 
 Zambia
 Climate of Zambia
 Railway stations in Zambia

References

External links 
 Orphanage Children's Nest in Choma

Choma District
Populated places in Southern Province, Zambia